Toobanna is a rural town and locality in the Shire of Hinchinbrook, Queensland, Australia.

Geography 
The town is roughly in the centre of the locality. The eastern boundary of the locality is Trebonne Creek, which then flows through the locality, just to the south of the town, and then forms the north-western boundary, ultimately being a tributary of the Herbert River which flows into the Coral Sea. The southern boundary is Cattle Creek, which ultimately flows into the Coral Sea.

The locality is generally flat and low-lying ( above sea level). It is freehold land which is used for farming with sugarcane being a major crop.

The Bruce Highway and the North Coast railway line traverse the locality from south to north, passing just near the town, the railway being immediately parallel and east of the highway. The town is served by the Toobanna railway station as well as private sugarcane tramways.

History 
The town takes its name from its railway station, which was named by the Queensland Railways Department on 19 April 1916. The name Toobanna is said to be an Aboriginal word, meaning plenty of big rushes (reeds) near the water.

Toobanna State School opened on 16 August 1922.

In the  the locality of Toobanna had a population of 278 people.

Education 
Toobanna State School is a co-educational government primary school (P-6) at 49055 Bruce Highway. In 2016, the school had enrolment of 21 students with 3 teachers (2 full-time equivalent) and 6 non-teaching staff (2 full-time equivalent).

References

Further reading

External links 
 ]

Towns in Queensland
Shire of Hinchinbrook
Localities in Queensland